Salcia is a commune located in Mehedinți County, Oltenia, Romania. It is composed of a single village, Salcia.

References

Communes in Mehedinți County
Localities in Oltenia